Joseph is an extinct town in Idaho County, in the U.S. state of Idaho. The GNIS classifies it as a populated place.

A post office called Joseph was established in 1905, and remained in operation until 1944. The community was named after Chief Joseph, a Nez Perce chieftain.

References

Ghost towns in Idaho
Landforms of Idaho County, Idaho